The Canadian ambassador to Afghanistan is the official representative of the Canadian government to the government of Afghanistan. The official title for the ambassador is the Ambassador Extraordinary and Plenipotentiary of Canada to the Islamic Republic of Afghanistan. The current senior Canadian diplomat titled as the Special Representative of Canada to the Islamic Republic of Afghanistan is David Sproule who was appointed on the advice of Prime Minister Justin Trudeau on October 7, 2022.

The Embassy of Canada is located at Street No. 15, House No. 256, Wazir Akbar Khan in Kabul, Afghanistan.

History of diplomatic relations 

Diplomatic relations between Canada and Afghanistan were established in 1968, with the first ambassador, Charles Eustace McGaughey, appointed on the advice of Prime Minister Lester B. Pearson on March 21, 1968. Diplomatic relations were severed in December 1979 the change in government resulting from the Soviet–Afghan War. Diplomatic relations were restored between Canada and Afghanistan on January 22, 2002, following the 2001 Bonn Conference and the appointment of Hamid Karzai as Chairman of the Afghan Interim Administration. Relations between Canada and Afghanistan were suspended on following the fall of Kabul, and the taliban take over. The most recent Ambassador was Reid Sirrs.

List of Canadian ambassadors to Afghanistan

See also 
 Afghanistan–Canada relations

References 

Bibliography

External Links 
 

Afghanistan
 
Canada